Sheppard "Shep" Homans Jr. (September 24, 1871 – March 30, 1952) was an All-American football player and insurance executive.  He was selected as an All-American at the fullback position while playing for Princeton University in both 1890 and 1891.

Early years
Homans grew up in Englewood, New Jersey, where his father, Sheppard Homans Sr., was prominent in the life insurance business.  His father was the founder and president of the Provident Savings Life Assurance Company.

All-American at Princeton
Homans attended Princeton University.  He played fullback for Princeton's varsity football team, taking the place of Knowlton "Snake" Ames—who was considered one of the greatest running backs in the early days of the game.  When Homans took over for Ames, one newspaper noted: "Sheppard Homans, Jr., of Englewood, N.J., is the man who will fill 'Snake' Ames' position as fullback.  He is at times a little slow, but he is a sure drop kicker and a hard punter."

Homans later recalled sitting on the sidelines in 1889 and then having his chance to start in 1890:
Homans proved to be a capable replacement for Ames, serving as Princeton's fullback from 1890 to 1892.  He was selected as an All-American in both 1890 and 1891.  A December 1892 profile of the Princeton team said of Homans: "Sheppard Homans, the team's full back, is a New Jersey boy and lives at Englewood.  He runs and dodges with great skill and is one of 'Old Nassau's' best men.  His age is 21, his height 5 ft. 9 in. and his weight 160 pounds."

Homans later became friends with the noted sports writer Grantland Rice.  When Homans died in 1952, Rice paid tribute to Homans as a legend of the game:

Semi-professional football
After graduating from Princeton, Homans played semi-professional football for the Tenakill Outing Club.  An article from The Philadelphia Inquirer in 1893 noted that Homans' punts and long runs were the features of a 12-0 victory over the Crescent Athletic Club.

Tennis and golf champion
Homans also became a competitive tennis player and golfer. In 1903, he won the indoor singles tennis championship in New York.  And in 1929 he won the senior golf championship in Pinehurst, North Carolina.

Family and business career
In April 1901, Homans married Loraine Eleanor Vanderpool, daughter of one of Newark's wealthiest citizens, at Trinity Episcopal Church in Newark, New Jersey.  Their son, Gene Homans, was a championship golfer and tennis players in the 1920s and 1930s.

Homans later went into the life insurance business and was a partner in Prosser & Homans in New York, general agents for Equitable Life Assurance Society of America.  In September 1920, a bomb was set off on Wall Street by "American anarchist fighters" who, prior to the bombing, sent a postcard to Homans that read, "Dear Shep: Keep away from Wall Street this Wednesday afternoon.  There never was a road that didn't have a turn."

Homans was a resident of Englewood, New Jersey throughout his life.  He died at a hospital in Charleston, South Carolina.

References

1871 births
1952 deaths
19th-century players of American football
All-American college football players
American football fullbacks
People from Englewood, New Jersey
Princeton Tigers football players
Players of American football from New Jersey